San Fernando, officially the Municipality of San Fernando,  is a 5th class municipality in the province of Masbate, Philippines. According to the 2020 census, it has a population of 21,600 people.

It is located on Ticao Island. The economy of the town is based on fishing, farming, and other trades.

In 1951, the barrios of Batuan, Burgos, Gibraltar, Costa Rica, Panisihan, and Matabao were separated from San Fernando to form the town of Batuan.

Geography

Barangays
San Fernando is politically subdivided into 26 barangays.

Climate

Demographics

Economy

Archaeological and Ecological Landscape and Seascape of Ticao
The municipality is part of Ticao Island, which is known as an archaeological landscape, possessing thousands of pre-colonial artifacts such as the Baybayin-inscribed Rizal Stone, Ticao gold spike teeth, Burial jars of varying designs and sizes, jade beads, human face rock statues, and the Ticao petrographs. Much of the homes in Ticao Island use these archaeological finds to design their interiors. The island is also an ecological frontier for the conservation of manta rays. The island also possesses a 'rare subspecies' of Visayan warty pig, that is almost near extinction.

References

External links
 [ Philippine Standard Geographic Code]
Philippine Census Information
Local Governance Performance Management System

Municipalities of Masbate